Compression molding is a method of molding in which the molding material, generally preheated, is first placed in an open, heated mold cavity. The mold is closed with a top force or plug member, pressure is applied to force the material into contact with all mold areas, while heat and pressure are maintained until the molding material has cured; this process is known as compression molding method and in case of rubber it is also known as 'Vulcanisation'. The process employs thermosetting resins in a partially cured stage, either in the form of granules, putty-like masses, or preforms. 

Compression molding is a high-volume, high-pressure method suitable for molding complex, high-strength fiberglass reinforcements. Advanced composite thermoplastics can also be compression molded with unidirectional tapes, woven fabrics, randomly oriented fiber mat or chopped strand. The advantage of compression molding is its ability to mold large, fairly intricate parts. Also, it is one of the lowest cost molding methods compared with other methods such as transfer molding and injection molding; moreover it wastes relatively little material, giving it an advantage when working with expensive compounds. 

However, compression molding often provides poor product consistency and difficulty in controlling flashing, and it is not suitable for some types of parts. Fewer knit lines are produced and a smaller amount of fiber-length degradation is noticeable when compared to injection molding.  Compression-molding is also suitable for ultra-large basic shape production in sizes beyond the capacity of extrusion techniques.  Materials that are typically manufactured through compression molding include: Polyester fiberglass resin systems (SMC/BMC), Torlon, Vespel, Poly(p-phenylene sulfide) (PPS), and many grades of PEEK. 

Compression molding is commonly utilized by product development engineers seeking cost effective rubber and silicone parts. Manufacturers of low volume compression molded components include PrintForm, 3D, STYS, and Aero MFG.

Compression molding was first developed to manufacture composite parts for metal replacement applications, compression molding is typically used to make larger flat or moderately curved parts. This method of molding is greatly used in manufacturing automotive parts such as hoods, fenders, scoops, spoilers, as well as smaller more intricate parts.  
The material to be molded is positioned in the mold cavity and the heated platens are closed by a hydraulic ram.  Bulk molding compound (BMC) or sheet molding compound (SMC), are conformed to the mold form by the applied pressure and heated until the curing reaction occurs.  SMC feed material usually is cut to conform to the surface area of the mold.  The mold is then cooled and the part removed.

Materials may be loaded into the mold either in the form of pellets or sheet, or the mold may be loaded from a plasticating extruder. Materials are heated above their melting points, formed and cooled. The more evenly the feed material is distributed over the mold surface, the less flow orientation occurs during the compression stage.

Compression molding is also widely used to produce sandwich structures that incorporate a core material such as a honeycomb or polymer foam.

Thermoplastic matrices are commonplace in mass production industries.  One significant example are automotive applications where the leading technologies are long fibre reinforced thermoplastics (LFT) and glass fiber mat reinforced thermoplastics (GMT).

In compression molding there are six important considerations that an engineer should bear in mind:
Determining the proper amount of material.
Determining the minimum amount of energy required to heat the material. 
Determining the minimum time required to heat the material. 
Determining the appropriate heating technique.
Predicting the required force, to ensure that shot attains the proper shape.
Designing the mold for rapid cooling after the material has been compressed into the mold.

Process definition
Compression molding is a forming process in which a plastic material is placed directly into a heated metal mold then is softened by the heat and therefore forced to conform to the shape of the mold, as the mold closes. Once molding is completed excess Flash may be removed. Typically, compression molding machines open along a vertical axis.

Process characteristics
The use of thermoset plastic compounds characterizes this molding process from many of the other molding processes.  These thermosets can be in either preform or granule shapes.  Unlike some of the other processes we find that the materials are usually preheated and measured before molding.  This helps to reduce excess flash.  Inserts, usually metallic, can also be molded with the plastic.  As a side note, remember not to allow any undercuts on the shape, it will make ejection especially difficult. Thermoplastic matrices with an inherent indefinite shelf-life and shorter cycle molding times are widely used and examples are shown in Ref 3.

Process schematic
Compression molding is one of the oldest manufacturing techniques for rubber molding. The process parameters include molding time, temperature, and pressure. Usually, a 300-400 ton clamp pressure is used. The typical mold is shaped like a clam shell with the bottom being the mold cavity. The molding press looked a lot like a ladle filled vertical press used for casting aluminum. Compression molding uses preforms made by an extruder and wink cutter (in which two blades meet at the center to cut the extrudate to length) or a roller die and die cutter.

Compression molded water bottles are made from die-cut 3 inch by 6 inch sheets. One sheet is placed below a core and one sheet of equal size is placed above the core, and then the top of the mold is lowered by hand or by hoist to near shut. The mold is then pushed into the press, and the press is hydraulically closed to full pressure. The mold temperature is about 350 degrees. When the cycle ends (after about 3.5-4.0 minutes), the press opens and the mold is pulled out toward the operator. The operator opens the clam shell mold top and leans the top of the mold back against the press. Exposed is the bottle with the core still inside. While the bottle is still hot, the operator inserts prongs in between the bottle and the steel core and stretches the bottle at the neck to free it from the core.

The preforms for compression molded golf ball centers are extruded. The preform has a 1 inch by 1 inch round slug that stands up in the mold cavity. During the cycle, the operator loads the jig with slugs and places the jig over the mold. The preforms are released into the cavity of the mold when the slide tray is pulled. When the mold is opened, the lower platen lowers and the mold is hydraulically pushed out to the operator. The heat sheet (all molded parts from that cycle joined together by a parting line rind (flash)) is then placed in a transfer cart to be die cut.

Typical tools and geometry produced
Three types of molds used are the flash plunger-type, straight plunger-type, and the "landed" plunger-type molds.  The flash type mold must have an accurate charge of plastic and produces a horizontal flash (excess material protruding from the mold).  The straight plunger-type mold allows for some inaccuracy in the charge of plastic and produces a vertical flash.  The landed plunger type mold must have an accurate charge of plastic, and no flash is produced. Further details are explained in Ref 3.

See also
Matrix molding

References

Bibliography
Todd, Robert H., Dell K. Allen, and Leo Alting. Manufacturing Processes Reference Guide. New York: Industrial P, Incorporated, 1993 on page 219-220....

Molding processes